The Scottish National Gallery of Modern Art is part of the National Galleries of Scotland, which are based in Edinburgh, Scotland. The National Gallery of Modern Art houses the collection of modern and contemporary art dating from about 1900 to the present in two buildings, Modern One and Modern Two, that face each other on Belford Road to the west of the city centre.

The National Gallery has a collection of more than 6000 paintings, sculptures, installations, video work, prints and drawings and also stages major exhibitions.

Inverleith House
The first Scottish National Gallery of Modern Art opened in August 1960 in Inverleith House, a Georgian building set in the middle of Edinburgh's Royal Botanic Garden. In 1984 the Gallery moved to Belford Road, and Inverleith House became a contemporary art gallery, curated by the Royal Botanic Garden, also featuring exhibitions of works and specimens from its historic collections.

Modern One
In 1984 the National Gallery moved to the former premises of the John Watson's Institution, a large neo-classical building designed by William Burn in 1825 as a refuge for fatherless children.

Works from the collection are presented here as well as a programme of changing exhibitions. The early part of the collection features European art from the beginning of the twentieth century, including work by André Derain and Pierre Bonnard, cubist paintings and holdings of expressionist and modern British art. Special highlights include paintings by Henri Matisse and Pablo Picasso and the Scottish Colourists Samuel John Peploe, John Duncan Fergusson, Francis Cadell and Leslie Hunter.

The Gallery has a renowned collection of international post-war work and an outstanding collection of modern Scottish art. The post-war collection features art by Francis Bacon, David Hockney, Andy Warhol, Joan Eardley and Alan Davie, with more recent works by artists including Douglas Gordon, Antony Gormley, Robert Priseman and Tracey Emin. The collection also includes ARTIST ROOMS, a collection of modern and contemporary art acquired for the nation by National Galleries of Scotland and Tate through the Anthony d'Offay donation with support from the National Heritage Memorial Fund, the Art Fund and the Scottish and British Governments. The growing collection includes works by major international artists including Andy Warhol, Louise Bourgeois, Robert Mapplethorpe and Damien Hirst. The displays change on a regular basis.

Modern Two

Across the road, the Dean Orphan Hospital designed by Thomas Hamilton was constructed in 1833. It was converted to a gallery in 1999 by Terry Farrell and Partners.

Modern Two (previously known as the Dean Gallery) is home to a changing programme of world-class exhibitions and displays drawn from the permanent collection. On permanent display is a recreation of the sculptor Eduardo Paolozzi's studio, as well as his 7.3 metre-tall sculpture, Vulcan, that dominates the café. Modern Two is also home to the gallery's world-famous collection of Surrealism, including works by Salvador Dalí, René Magritte and Alberto Giacometti. The building houses a library, archive and special books collection. The library's great strengths are Dada and Surrealism, early twentieth century artists and contemporary Scottish art. The archive contains over 120 holdings relating to twentieth and twenty-first century artists, collectors and art organisations, including the gallery's own papers. The archive holds one of the world's best collections of Dada and Surrealist material, largely made up by the collections of Roland Penrose and Gabrielle Keiller. The special books collection contains over 2,500 artist books and limited edition livres d’artiste, again with a main focus on Dada and Surrealism, but also books by other major artists from the twentieth century including Oskar Kokoschka's Die Träumenden Knaben (1917) and Henri Matisse's Jazz (1947) . This material is available to the public in the reading room, open to the public by appointment.  There are regular changing displays in the Gabrielle Keiller library to showcase items from these collections.

Outdoor sculpture

Modern One and Two are set in extensive parkland, where visitors can discover sculpture by such artists as Ian Hamilton Finlay, Barbara Hepworth, Henry Moore, George Rickey, Rachel Whiteread, Richard Long and Nathan Coley. The lawn to the front of Modern One was re-landscaped in 2002 to a design by Charles Jencks. This dramatic work, or Landform, comprises a stepped, serpentine mound reflected in three crescent-shaped pools of water. The façade of Modern One is home to Martin Creed's Work No. 975, EVERYTHING IS GOING TO BE ALRIGHT. Modern One backs on to the Water of Leith river and walkway, which can be accessed by a long flight of steep steps behind the Gallery.

Governance
The gallery's director is Simon Groom, who was appointed in 2007.

See also
 National Galleries of Scotland
 In the Car

References

External links

Scottish National Galleries – official website

Art museums established in 1960
Art museums and galleries in Edinburgh
Modern art museums
Modern art
Category A listed buildings in Edinburgh
1960 establishments in Scotland
Neoclassical architecture in Scotland
Contemporary art galleries in Scotland
Scottish Modern art